Friendship Heights is an urban commercial and residential neighborhood in northwest Washington, D.C. and southern Montgomery County, Maryland. Though its borders are not clearly defined, Friendship Heights consists roughly of the neighborhoods and commercial areas around Wisconsin Avenue north of Fessenden Street NW and Tenleytown to Somerset Terrace and Willard Avenue in Maryland, and from River Road in the west to Reno Road and 41st Street in the east. Within Maryland west of Wisconsin Avenue is the Village of Friendship Heights, technically a special taxation district.

The portion in the District of Columbia lies in Ward 3, represented by ANCs 3E03 and 3E04. It is often considered to be part of Chevy Chase, D.C.; 
The most substantial commercial aspects are the shopping plazas near the intersection of Wisconsin and Western Avenues. Found here are many department stores, as well as numerous boutiques, day spas, a multiplex cinema and other services which cater to the residents as well as visitors to the area. The area also features a variety of moderate and discount chains.

The neighborhood also supports a number of offices, including the corporate headquarters of insurance giant GEICO (originally Government Employees Insurance Company) and the Ritz-Carlton hotel chain, and a concentration of broadcast media including the studios of WMAL-FM and WTOP-FM. As a result, heavy traffic is not uncommon.

The Friendship Heights Station on the Red Line of the Washington Metro system serves the area, and the station is also a major connecting depot for area bus services. Streetcar service, which once connected the neighborhood to Georgetown, was abandoned in 1960.

Since the late 1990s, development has accelerated in the neighborhood, notably the construction of Chase Tower on Willard Avenue, a new Chevy Chase Center replacing the older 1980s-era complex of the same name, and new condominiums on the site of the former Washington Women's Clinic.

Retail

Education
District of Columbia Public Schools operates public schools. Friendship Heights is served by Janney Elementary School, Alice Deal Middle School, and Jackson-Reed High School.

The Maryland side of Friendship Heights is served by Somerset Elementary School, Westland Middle School, and Bethesda Chevy Chase High School.

District of Columbia Public Library operates the Tenley-Friendship Library. After seven years in an interim location, the library reopened in 2011 at the corner of Wisconsin Avenue and Albemarle Streets.

See also

List of upscale shopping districts

External links 
 Friendship Heights Alliance

References

 
Neighborhoods in Northwest (Washington, D.C.)
Shopping districts and streets in the United States